Malefica (meaning "witch" or "sorceress") is a genus of hadrosaurid dinosaur from the Late Cretaceous (Campanian) Aguja Formation of Texas. The type and only species is Malefica deckerti.

Discovery and naming 
The holotype of Malefica, TxVP 41917-1, is a partial left maxilla recovered from Bruja Canyon in Big Bend National Park. In 2002, it was assigned to the genus Kritosaurus, as cf. K. navajovius. Twenty years later, it was discovered to contain a number of useful diagnostic traits that allow it to be described as a new taxon, despite being fragmentary. The chosen generic name, "Malefica", means "witch" or "sorceress", also the root word of "maleficent", referring to its discovery in Bruja Canyon (bruja being Spanish for "witch"). The specific name, "deckerti", honours Frank Deckert, the specimen's discoverer and former superintendent of Big Bend National Park.

Classification 
Prieto-Márquez performed a phylogenetic analysis which recovered Malefica as a basal member of the Hadrosauridae, outside the clade Saurolophidae (=Euhadrosauria), containing the major subfamilies Lambeosaurinae and Saurolophinae. This, along with the recovery of several hadrosauromorph taxa at the base of Hadrosauridae, adds to a greater diversity of non-saurolophid hadrosaurids known from the Santonian to Maastrichtian.

Paleoenvironment 
The Aguja Formation outcrops both in Texas and the neighboring Mexican states of Chihuahua and Coahuila. Malefica is known from the Texan side. Other animals found in this area include the contemporary basal hadrosaurid Aquilarhinus, the lambeosaurine Angulomastacator, the pachycephalosaur Texacephale, the ceratopsid Agujaceratops, a dromaeosaurid similar to Saurornitholestes, and the giant alligatoroid Deinosuchus.

References 

Hadrosaurs
Late Cretaceous dinosaurs of North America
Fossil taxa described in 2022
Ornithischian genera